NH 110 may refer to:

 National Highway 110 (India)
 New Hampshire Route 110, United States